Israeli spring may refer to:

 2011 Israeli social justice protests
 2023 Israeli anti-judicial reform protests